Cosmin Petrișor Sârbu (born 29 March 1996) is a Romanian professional footballer who plays as a midfielder or forward for Lotus Băile Felix, in the Liga III.

Career

Liberty Salonta
Sârbu started his career at Liberty Salonta Football Academy. He played almost all his youth career at Salonta until 2013 when the youth center was dissolved.

Bihor Oradea
After the dissolution of Liberty Salonta he signed with Bihor Oradea, the most important club of Bihor County. There, he played one year at youth level then on 28 November 2014 he made his debut in Liga II in a match against CS Mioveni.

FCM Baia Mare
In 2015, Sârbu signed with FCM Baia Mare and in one season at Liga II he played 31 matches and scored 7 goals, being one of the best players of the team.

CFR Cluj
After being close to sign with Rapid București he signed with CFR Cluj in the summer of 2016 and made his debut in Liga I on 5 March 2017 in a match against Viitorul Constanța.

References

External links
 
 

1996 births
Living people
People from Moldova Nouă
Romanian footballers
Association football midfielders
Liga I players
Liga II players
Liga III players
CF Liberty Oradea players
FC Bihor Oradea players
CS Minaur Baia Mare (football) players
CFR Cluj players
ASA 2013 Târgu Mureș players
FC Ripensia Timișoara players